Rowdy Annayya is a 1993 Indian Telugu-language action drama film written by Satya Murthy, directed by Tammareddy Bharadwaja starring Krishna and Rambha. Vidyasagar scored and composed the film's soundtrack. The storyline of the film had similarities to Varasudochadu and was further used in Samarasimha Reddy and Athadu.

The film set on a village backdrop revolves around a mysterious stranger who supports the family of a benevolent Dharma Rao after the latter faces troubles at the hands of his cruel brother, Ranga Rao. The film failed at the box office.

Plot

A tractor driver moves into a village and begins a crusade against the corrupt village head, Ranga Rao. As it turns out, the driver is actually a criminal lawyer who wishes to atone for his past sins.

Cast 
 Krishna Ghattamaneni
 Rambha
 Srikanth
 Chandra Mohan
 Dharmavarapu Subrahmanyam
 Ashok Kumar
 Costumes Krishna
 Balayya
 Nirmalamma
 Silk Smitha

Music 
Vidyasagar scored and composed the film's soundtrack with lyrics penned by Bhuvana Chandra.
 "Chilakamma" - Mano, S. P. Balasubrahmanyam
 "Chuk Chuk" - Mano, Malgudi Subha
 "Dhim Dhinaka" - S.P.B., S. P. Sailaja
 "Attatta" - S.P.B., Minmini
 "Nuvvoste" - Mano, S. P. Sailaja
 "Jhummane" - S.P.B., K. S. Chitra

References 

1993 films
Indian action drama films
Films scored by Vidyasagar
1990s action drama films
1990s Telugu-language films